Benzanthrone (BZA) is a polycyclic aromatic hydrocarbon.  It is a yellow solid. Its derivatives are used as a dyestuff intermediate for anthraquinone-based dyes. Dehydrogenative coupling gives violanthrone.  It is prepared by reduction of anthroquinone to anthrone followed by alkylation with a mixture of glycerol and sulfuric acid.

It is a basic substance with fluorescent and luminescent properties. It can be used for photosensitization, and as a charge transport material. It is also used in pyrotechnics industry, mainly as a component of some older formulations of green and yellow colored smokes, often together with Vat Yellow 4; its US military specification is MIL-D-50074D.

Safety 
Benzanthrone causes itching and burning sensations on exposed skin, together with erythema, dermatitis, and skin pigmentation.

See also
 3-Nitrobenzanthrone

References

External links
 National Pollutant Inventory - Polycyclic Aromatic Hydrocarbon Fact Sheet

Fluorescent dyes
Ketones
Polycyclic aromatic compounds